Maurice Ligeon (born September 2, 1977) is an American former professional soccer player of Surinamese descent, who spent his entire career in Europe and earned one cap with the United States national team.

Playing career

Club
Ligeon began his career on the Club Brugge K.V. youth team. He played the 1997–98 season with Dutch Second Division club Telstar. He was then listed with the amateur club SV Huizen from 1999 to 2002. He left the team during the 2001–02 season, but returned for the 2002–03 season only to resign again on December 16, 2003. He was then listed with KSJB from 2005 to 2007.

international
Ligeon earned one cap with the United States national team, as a 17-year old in a 2–1 loss to Saudi Arabia in Dhahran on October 19, 1994 when he came on for Lawrence Lozzano in the 72nd minute.

Managerial career
In September 2010 he joined Clarence Seedorf's Surinamese club S.V. The Brothers as manager. In the summer of 2012, Ligeon was appointed manager of Dutch amateur team FC Almere. In the summer of 2018, Ligeon was appointed manager of Dutch team VV Unicum Lelystad.

Personal life
Ligeon is of Surinamese descent and the brother of Ruben Ligeon.

References

External links
 
 Photo of Ligeon with Huizen in 2002
 

1977 births
Living people
American soccer players
United States men's international soccer players
SC Telstar players
SV Huizen players
Eerste Divisie players
Association football midfielders
American people of Surinamese descent
Sportspeople of Surinamese descent
Expatriate football managers in Suriname